The Arthrodermataceae are a family of fungi containing nine dermatophyte genera — Epidermophyton, Microsporum, Nannizzia, Trichophyton, Paraphyton, Lophophyton, Guarromyces, Ctenomyces and Arthroderma.

References

External links
Trichophyton spp. at Doctor Fungus
Mycology Unit at the Adelaide Women's and Children's Hospital 

 
Parasitic fungi
Onygenales
Ascomycota families